Alpha agonist may refer to:

 Alpha-adrenergic agonist, drugs that selectively stimulate alpha adrenergic receptors
 PPAR-alpha agonist, drugs which act upon the peroxisome proliferator-activated receptor alpha